= Sufiabad railway station =

Railway station in Pakistan

Coordinates: 25.120244°N 69.152704°E

General information
- Owner: Ministry of Railways

Other information
- Station code: SFB

History
- Former names: Great Indian Peninsula Railway
Location

Sufiabad railway station (Urdu: صوفی آباد ریلوے اسٹیشن) is located in Pakistan.

== See also ==
- List of railway stations in Pakistan
- Pakistan Railways
